The beach volleyball competition at the 2022 Pacific Mini Games will be held from 20 to 24 June 2022 at the Crowne Plaza Resort Beach in Saipan, and Tachogna Beach in Tinian, Northern Mariana Islands.

Competition schedule

Participating nations
As of 1 June 2022, eleven countries and territories have confirmed their participation in beach volleyball for the games.

Medal summary

Medal table

Medalists

References

2022 Pacific Mini Games
2022
Pacific Mini Games